Molde Fotballklubb is a Norwegian association football club based in Molde, Norway. The club was formed in 1911 as International. The club was renamed Molde FK in 1915. Molde had several grounds as their home ground until they in 1955 began to permanently use Molde Stadion as their home ground. In 1998, they moved to their current home ground, Aker Stadion.

Since Molde's first competitive match, a number of players have made a competitive first-team appearance for the club. Many of these players have spent only a short period of their career at Molde FK before seeking opportunities in other teams; some players had their careers cut short by injury, while others left for other reasons.

Players
Appearances and goals are for first-team competitive matches only, including Eliteserien, 1. divisjon, Norwegian Cup, Eliteserien play-offs, Champions League, UEFA Cup/Europa League and Cup Winners' Cup.
Players are listed according to the date of their first-team debut for the club.

This list is under construction. Statistics correct as of match played 13 November 2022

Table headers
 Nationality – If a player played international football, the country/countries he played for are shown. Otherwise, the player's nationality is given as their country of birth.
 Molde career – The year of the player's first appearance for Molde FK to the year of his last appearance.
 Total – The total number of matches played, both as a starter and as a substitute.

Notes
 A utility player is one who is considered to play in more than one position.

References

 
Molde FK
Association football player non-biographical articles